The Southern Provinces or Moroccan Sahara are the terms used by the Moroccan government for the disputed territory of Western Sahara. These two Moroccan terms explicitly include all of Western Sahara, which spans three of the country's 12 top-level administrative regions. The term "Southern Provinces" is frequently used in Moroccan state television (such as weather forecasts, displayed maps on the news, and government statements).

Background
Western Sahara was previously a Spanish colony known as the Spanish Sahara. During the 1970s, Spain faced increasing pressure from Morocco to hand over the territory, culminating in the Green March, a mass demonstration coordinated by the Moroccan government that was launched on 6 November 1975. The Green March was organized to pressure Spain into ceding Western Sahara to Morocco. The Madrid Accords, which were ratified 12 days after the Green March, stated that Spain would leave the Western Sahara by 28 February 1976 at the latest. Morocco and Mauritania signed the Western Sahara partition agreement on 14 April 1976, which caused Morocco to take control of Saguia el-Hamra, and the northern part of Río de Oro, while Mauritania took control of the remaining part of Río de Oro and renamed it as Tiris al-Gharbiyya. 

A locally based Sahrawi national liberation movement, known as the Polisario Front, launched a guerrilla war on the 27th February 1976 with the crucial financial and logistical backing of Algeria and Libya, aiming to win independence of the territory under the "Sahrawi Arab Democratic Republic" (SADR). Following bloody clashes with the Polisario troops (SPLA) and deteriorating ties with Algeria, Mauritania pulled out in 1979 and gave up its share in the Western Sahara in order to avoid further complicated conflicts with the Sahrawi Republic, Algeria, and Morocco. Morocco then seized the opportunity and took control of the remaining part of Río de Oro as well, which had been recognized by the Moroccan government as Mauritanian a few years earlier.

Since a United Nations-sponsored ceasefire agreement in 1991, about two thirds of the territory is administered by Morocco, including the majority of the coast. This territory is separated by the Moroccan Western Sahara Wall or "the Berm" from the Polisario Front-controlled eastern third, which the Polisario Front calls the "Free Zone".

The ceasefire line corresponds to the route of the Berm. Both sides claim sovereignty over the territory of Western Sahara in its entirety. The Sahrawi Arab Democratic Republic has been recognized by 84 nations, and is a full member of the African Union, but not of the UN. Moroccan territorial integrity is implicitly recognized by the Arab League with strong reservations from Algeria and Syria.

Overview
The Moroccan government controls and administers roughly two thirds of Western Sahara (the part west of the Berm), while the rest makes up the Polisario Front-controlled Sahrawi Arab Democratic Republic. 

The two thirds of Western Sahara that are controlled by Morocco are treated by the government as sovereign Moroccan territory. The government conducts various economic and social development programs and includes these "Southern Provinces" in the national budget of government funding, national sport competitions, education programs, and national parliamentary elections. The entire Western Sahara has a population of about 576,000.> Government and private companies exploit coastal areas for fishing and the land areas for phosphate mining.

Administratively, Morocco divided the territory under its control into administrative units (wilayas). Flags and coats of arms were created for the three wilayas of Boujdour, Smara and Laayoune. There were further changes in the territories in 1983, with the area becoming four wilayas through the addition of Dakhla. In 1990 Wadi al-Dhahab (Río de Oro) was added.

The current organisation of the Morocco occupied Southern Provinces, consists of three regions: Guelmim-Oued Noun in the north, Laâyoune-Sakia El Hamra in the centre, and Dakhla-Oued Ed-Dahab in the south. These, in turn, are divided into ten provinces. The regions of Guelmim-Oued Noun and Laâyoune-Sakia El Hamra include some territories lying in Western Sahara as well as some undisputed Moroccan territories, lying just to the north.

Morocco has assigned a special satellite TV channel for the "Southern Provinces", called Laayoun TV.

Moroccan settlers

Following the 1975 Green March, the Moroccan state has sponsored settlement schemes enticing thousands of Moroccans to move into the Moroccan-occupied part of Western Sahara (80% of the territory). By 2015, it was estimated that Moroccan settlers made up at least two thirds of the 500,000 inhabitants. In addition to guaranteeing a right of return for the Sahrawi refugees, the Sahrawi government in exile has indicated a willingness to offer Sahrawi citizenship to Moroccan settlers and their descendants in a future independent state.

References

Former regions of Morocco
History of Western Sahara
Disputed territories in Africa
Sahrawi Arab Democratic Republic
States and territories established in 1971
States and territories disestablished in 1997
1971 establishments in Morocco
1970s establishments in Western Sahara
1997 disestablishments in Africa
Geographical naming disputes